Trofeo EFE is an annual football award given by the EFE news agency since the 1990–91 season to the best Latin-American player in Spanish football. Recipients are selected based on assessments from the agency's sports editors.

The inaugural winner was Rommel Fernández from Panama. Chilean Iván Zamorano and Brazilian Ronaldo Nazário have won the award twice. In 2000 Argentine Fernando Redondo received a special distinction as the best player of the 1990s decade. In the 2017–18 season, the award expanded beyond Spain, with Uruguayan Edinson Cavani becoming the first player outside the Spanish La Liga to win the award, doing so with French Ligue 1 side Paris Saint-Germain. In the 2018–19 season, the award was not given, and in 2019–20 it was won by a woman for the first time ever, Colombian midfielder Leicy Santos.

Argentine legend Lionel Messi has won the award a record five times, more than any other player.

Winners

Wins by player

 Note: In 2013 the player was not eligible for the award as his birth country (Portugal) belongs to the continent of Europe, not Latin America.

See also
 LFP Awards
 Don Balón
 Trofeo Alfredo Di Stéfano
 Trofeo Aldo Rovira
FIFA World Player of the Year
European Footballer of the Year
European Golden Boot
Onze Mondial European Footballer of the Year
World Soccer Player of the Year

References

External links
 Agencia EFE

La Liga
Spanish football trophies and awards